The International Financial Services Commission (IFSC) is the Belize government agency responsible for financial regulation.  It is responsible for regulating all financial market participants, exchanges and the setting and enforcing of financial regulations. A number of international online forex brokers obtain their international license from IFSC.

History
IFSC was established in Belize in 1999. The aim of the Commission is licensing of financial companies, as well as controlling and supervision of all regulated firms to bind all international financial services requirements to their activity. IFSC is regulated by the Ministry of Belize Securities and International Financial Services Commission Act. IFSC functions on a special Code of conduct, which is aimed to increase considerably the level of services provided by the licensed company under the International Financial Services Commission.

Responsibilities
The Belize International Financial Services Commission has the following responsibilities:

 To promote, protect and enhance Belize as an international financial services center and to regulate the provision of international financial services;
 To supervise and control Licensed Investment Services Companies, Collective Investment Schemes, investment consultants and mutual fund management companies.
 To grant operation licences to investment firms, including investment consultants, brokerage firms and brokers.
 To impose administrative sanctions and disciplinary penalties to brokers, brokerage firms, investment consultants as well as to in any other legal or natural person whom fall under the provisions of the Act.

Regulated entities
Many international foreign exchange brokers with legal registration in the offshore jurisdiction of Belize are regulated and supervised by the International Financial Services Commission.

See also
Central Bank of Belize
Securities Commission
Caribbean Financial Action Task Force

References

External links 
IFSC Belize

Competition regulators
Belize
Consumer organisations in Belize
Financial regulatory authorities of Belize